Iridosornis is a genus of Neotropical birds in the tanager family Thraupidae

These birds live in the Andes mostly at high altitudes. Their plumage is mainly blue and all of them have contrasting patches of yellow.

Taxonomy and species list
The genus Iridosornis was introduced in 1844 by the French naturalist René Lesson
with the golden-crowned tanager as the type species. The name combines the Ancient Greek iris meaning "rainbow" with ornis meaning "bird". A molecular phylogenetic study published in 2014 found that this genus had a sister relationship to the vermilion tanager which is placed in its own monospecific genus Calochaetes.

The genus contains five species:

References

	

 
Bird genera
Taxa named by René Lesson